John Fields may refer to:

John Charles Fields, Canadian mathematician
John Fields (record producer)
John Fields (basketball), born March 30, 1988

See also
Jack Fields (disambiguation)
John Field (disambiguation)